Twin Plagues is an album by American quintet Wednesday, released by Orindal Records in August 2021.

Composition
Twin Plagues has musical footing in "punchy" grunge pop and "vitreous" guitar-pop, and is "as indie rock as it gets." It also leans into dissonant noise pop and shoegazing sounds.

Critical reception

Twin Plagues was welcomed with generally positive reviews upon its release. Kelly Liu of Pitchfork saw the band's sound as "big and loud...with an undercurrent of anxiety beneath the clutter."

Accolades

Track listing

Personnel
All credits adapted from the record's Bandcamp page.

Wednesday
 Karly Hartzman - vocals, guitar 
 Xandy Chelmis - lap steel, vocals on "One More Last One"
 Jake Lenderman - guitar 
 Alan Miller - drums 
 Margo Schultz - bass

Technical
 Alex Farrar and Adam McDaniel - recording, producing  
 Jake Lenderman - recording, producing

References

2021 albums